F71 may refer to:
 , a 1968 British Royal Navy Leander-class frigate
 , a 1970 Spanish Navy  Baleares-class frigate
 Moderate mental retardation, by ICD-10 code

Ship disambiguation pages